Rapid is the brand name given to the bus rapid transit system in San Diego County, California. The system serves nearly half the county, operating mainly on the HOV lanes on Interstates 15 and 805, with most of the stops also served by other routes. In addition, there are stations, dubbed as CenterLine in the medians of Interstate 15, Park Boulevard in San Diego and on East Palomar Street in Chula Vista, that are designed in a similar manner to the light rail stations. The system operates with a dedicated fleet, although buses from the Mainline fleet are regularly substituted. The system is administered, built and managed by San Diego Association of Governments (SANDAG) and is operated as part of the San Diego Metropolitan Transit System (MTS).

Planning for the initial "showcase" route began in 2002 with the commencement of an environmental review. It took 12 years and $238 million to get Rapid operational. Regular service began in summer 2014.

History

Early Beginnings (1990–2006)
In the 1990s, an extension of the San Diego Trolley was studied along Interstate 15. However, projected low ridership, hilly terrain and high cost estimates shelved this proposal. It was instead decided to construct a HOV lane system with Direct Access Ramps and transit centers in proximity to these ramps. Construction on these lanes began by 2001 with the first phase (between SR 163 and Sabre Springs) opening for traffic in 2006. At the same time, another trolley proposal was studied in Otay Ranch, but it was also decided that a BRT system would be essential.

In July 2002, the San Diego Association of Governments (SANDAG), the county's planning organization, initiated the planning process for what would eventually become the Mid City route. An environmental review for this route would later be published in 2008.

The SuperLoop experiment (2007–2013)

To test the technology to be used on the system, in 2007, SANDAG selected a series of streets in University City to be fitted with transit signal priority, in addition to building stations with real-time arrival displays. These services, dubbed as SuperLoop, began by mid-2009.

The success of these routes resulted in the SuperLoop routes becoming permanent additions, and eventually led to SANDAG placing a large order of 60-foot CNG buses, and the start of construction of the rest of the network. All phases of the I-15 HOV investment project were finished by 2011. The Rapid branding was announced in 2013, with the new buses arriving in December of that year, with corridor testing and driver training beginning the following January.

In Service (2014–present)
On May 17, 2014, the buses were accepted for passenger occupation, and in-service testing began on route 20 during a record-breaking heatwave caused by the Santa Ana winds at the time. These buses were wrapped with a vinyl sticker containing the official slogan, all in an effort to promote the upcoming service. MTS also registered the rapidmts.com domain around this time (since merged into the main site). It was also announced that the service would begin at the next service change on June 8, 2014. 

At the same time, the existing Premium Express routes would gradually be phased out. Former route 810 would become Rapid 235 and supplemented by Rapid Express routes 280 and 290, while former route 880 would be replaced by Rapid 237. The remaining routes would be discontinued altogether with June 6, 2014 being the final date of operation for the Premium Express network. Rapid service formally began the following Sunday, June 8, 2014, on schedule. Free bus rides were offered on that day. Rapid Express service began the following day. It inherited the 26 already existing motorcoach buses.

On March 11, 2018, MTS placed the I-15 CenterLine median stations into commission. These were the first stations on the I-15 Rapid (Route 235) to feature light-rail style station platforms, shelters, and NextBus information displays, and the first to be implemented since the Mid-City Rapid guideway in 2014.

By 2019, the full network was implemented and in operation.

COVID-19 pandemic precautions

In March 2020, the COVID-19 pandemic was declared. MTS began disinfecting vehicles as they return to the maintenance yards, and has begun sanitizing station platforms and installing handwashing stations at transit centers. MTS subsequently announced reductions to all Rapid services in April. There will be only 3 runs of route 280, 2 runs of route 290, 30 minute headways for routes 204, 225, 235 and 237, and 15 minute headways for the remainder. These schedules will remain in effect indefinitely.

On January 28, 2021, it was announced that MTS, in cooperation with NCTD, would begin offering free rides for passengers en route to receive a COVID-19 vaccine, by carrying a confirmation paper for their appointment.

On March 1, 2021, MTS placed 24 new Rapid Express motorcoaches into service. These motorcoaches are the MCI D-Series, and replaced the Express 4500s. The agency also switched to Biogas, a renewable form of CNG as an interim measure until the electric transition is completed in 2040.

Current services
Currently there are nine routes, three of which run on the I-15 corridor. Route 235 operates all day serving all stations along the corridor from Escondido to San Diego and then to Downtown San Diego, ending at the Santa Fe Depot. Service operates every 15 minutes during peak hours and every 30 minutes at all other times. The Rapid Express service operates from selected bus stations to Downtown San Diego, bypassing City Heights and Kearny Mesa. Route 280 serves the two northernmost stations (Escondido and Del Lago) while Route 290 serves the Rancho Bernardo and Sabre Springs/Peñasquitos stations. Route 237 serves the Miramar College Transit Station and then proceeds to UC San Diego via Mira Mesa Boulevard and the UTC Transit Center. Route 215 is the mid-city line providing service to downtown through SDSU, while Route 225 is the South Bay route, connecting Downtown with the South Bay communities. Additionally, Routes 201, 202 and 204 provide SuperLoop service between UC San Diego and the Westfield UTC mall.

Routes 201/202/204 (SuperLoop Rapid)
 
On September 6, 2015, the MTS SuperLoop (Routes 201, 202 and 204) were incorporated into the network. MTS markets the routes as a sub-brand and called SuperLoop Rapid.

Routes 201 (counter-clockwise) and 202 (clockwise) connect UC San Diego and Westfield UTC on a loop that passes through La Jolla Village, north University City, and the Jacobs Medical Center complex, while Route 204 serves the office parks and apartment complexes due east of UTC in a clockwise loop. In addition, it inherited the 12 Gas-Electric Hybrid buses that originally provided the service. These buses were re-vinyled into the Rapid livery, and also began serving Route 237 in addition to their native SuperLoop routes. In April 2018, these buses were retired from service and replaced by re-vinyled C40LF buses from the Mainline fleet.

Route 215 (Mid-City Rapid)

On October 12, 2014, the Mid-City Rapid (Route 215) service commenced operations from San Diego State University to Downtown San Diego via Balboa Park, North Park, Normal Heights, and City Heights. The buses used on this route are vinyled into the Rapid livery, but feature regular local-style transit bus seating instead. The next day, a peak hour rapid route, Route 237, commenced operation from the UC San Diego area to Rancho Bernardo, via San Diego and the I-15 HOT lanes. These routes have been described as "diet trolleys", but critics claim that the limited amount of spending on BRT compared to highway spending shows SANDAG's emphasis on highway and automobile-based transportation. Eventually, Route 237 was shortened to Miramar College due to an increased amount of transfers there, essentially making the route a school-to-school route, having colleges on both ends. This change was incorporated into the Transit Optimization Plan (TOP) in 2017.

Route 225 (South Bay Rapid)

The South Bay Rapid (Route 225) began limited peak-hour service on September 4, 2018 between the East Palomar Park and Ride in Chula Vista and Downtown San Diego. The route initially operated in the Rapid Express pattern, headed northbound (into Downtown) in the morning and southbound (returning from Downtown) in afternoons with no reverse-commute opportunities or weekend service. This route expanded to full daily service on January 26, 2019 and now operates along a 21-mile (34-kilometer) route between the Otay Mesa Transit Center near the Otay Mesa Port of Entry and Downtown San Diego. With this opening five new stations were also opened; these are located at Heritage Park, Lomas Verdes, Santa Venetia, the Otay Ranch Town Center, and at the recently developed, mixed-use Millenia community in Eastlake. It mostly follows the median on East Palomar Street, before running alongside Olympic Parkway and Eastlake Parkway to serve Otay Ranch. Throughout its planning, the route sparked controversy mainly by HOAs due to its bisection of the Otay Ranch and Eastlake communities and its proximity to nearby homes. The buses used on this route feature intercity coach-style seating, but have silver-colored destination displays on the outside compared to the rest of the fleet, which have amber ones. As with the opening of the original route, free bus rides were offered on the first week of operation on this route only.

Route 235 (I-15 Rapid)

The I-15 Rapid (Route 235) saves up to 45 minutes from local MTS Route 20, which continues to operate along the corridor to serve locations not served by the Rapid network. It also eliminates a transfer at Del Lago Transit Center between Route 20 and Breeze Rapid to central Escondido.

Initial cost
The cost for the initial operating segment is approximately $238 million, consisting primarily of transit centers at City Heights, Del Lago, Escondido, and Rancho Bernardo; parking structures at Miramar College and Sabre Springs; and new 60-foot buses. This is in addition to the investment in the I-15 HOT lane project, which cost approximately $1 billion for four new lanes and direct access ramps. Taxpayer advocates have supported the Rapid due to its lower cost compared to rail extensions at the time.

Route 237 (Mira Mesa Blvd. Rapid)
Route 237 operates between the Miramar College Transit Station and UCSD with stops at other transit centers and along Mira Mesa Boulevard.

Route 280/290 (I-15 Rapid Express)
Rapid Express service replaced the Premium Express service which formerly operated along the corridor, The new system now only calls at Transit Stations. Until March 2021, Biodiesel powered intercity coaches operate this service, when they were replaced with Biogas commuter coaches. Much like the network it replaced, Rapid Express operates peak-hours only, inbound in morning peak and outbound in afternoon peak, without reverse-commute services. Rapid Express services also terminate at the County Administration Building instead of the Santa Fe Depot.

Future plans

Iris Rapid
In late 2018, ABC 10News reported that rumors are speculating on a new route, possibly a route along the border, that would be the first new-built all-electric route. On September 13, 2019, SANDAG confirmed the rumors and announced the route as the Iris Rapid project (proposed route 227). MTS hopes to have the route operational by January 2023 at the earliest. The planned route is expected to run from Otay Mesa to Imperial Beach, and call at the route's namesake, the Iris Transit Center along the way.

South Bay Rapid infill stations
Early concept maps of the South Bay Rapid revealed the possibility of additional CenterLine stations in the medians of I-805 and SR 94. These will be located at Hilltop, National City/East, 47th Street trolley station, 28th Street and in East Village.

No concept art was initially drawn or published, but on January 26, 2019, this project was officially announced in a dedication ceremony and concept art was unveiled. Construction will begin once funding is secured.

Converting basic stops into stations
New shelters are due to be installed at the three Kearny Mesa stops, located at Ruffin Road, Overland Avenue, and at the Kearny Mesa interchange. The first shelter was installed on the inbound side of the Ruffin stop in 2017, next to the Kaiser Permanente San Diego Hospital. The remaining shelters are still in the final design stages.

Electrification
On November 30, 2017, MTS announced its procurement of all-electric buses. This makes MTS the fourth agency to place electric buses of any propulsion method into revenue service, only behind Muni, Antelope Valley Transit Authority, and Anaheim Resort Transit. Electrification is set for Summer 2019, when the Xcelsior CHARGE pilot units arrive. This Demonstrates MTS committed to be in compliance with Initiative Clean Transit, a proposed California law that could result in full electrification by 2040. These new buses will be placed into the system's Copley Park division and replace the C40LFs.

A grant for 11 more buses has been awarded to MTS.

Downtown layover facility
On June 22, 2018 SANDAG announced that it has seized control of a block of land currently occupied by an auto maintenance facility, a law firm and a car park. The agency plans to construct a Downtown layover facility for buses. Its perimeter will be bordered by A Street, Union Street, State Street and B Street. It will not serve passengers, but act in a similar manner to a yard, but without maintenance bays. SANDAG plans to begin construction in 2021 and the resulting facility being commissioned in Summer 2023.

Operation

Fares
As of September 1, 2019, the fare structure for Rapid is as follows. Passes can be purchased at any fare vending machine within the network.

Maintenance and operations
Operation of Rapid is split, with Transdev operating 3 routes under contract to MTS (225, 280 and 290), and directly by MTS for the remainder. This is because buses from different divisions are used on certain routes.

The fleet is maintained at the system's Imperial, Kearny Mesa, East County and South Bay divisions. The latter two are under maintenance contract to Transdev, which also includes routes assigned to these divisions.

In Downtown, the Broadway Rapid stations are patterned after the nearby Trolley stations on C Street, with stops at Horton Plaza, Civic Center/Courts, and at America Plaza.

Fleet 

Shown below is a summary of the MTS Rapid fleet from the past, present, and future:

Current Fleet

Past Fleet

Future Fleet

The MTS Rapid fleet is maintained across all of the system's divisions.

References

Bus transportation in California
Bus rapid transit in California
Public transportation in San Diego County, California
Transdev
Transportation in San Diego